Menidi (Greek: Μενίδι) is a former municipality in Aetolia-Acarnania, West Greece, Greece. Since the 2011 local government reform it is part of the municipality Amfilochia, of which it is a municipal unit. The municipal unit has an area of 107.730 km2. It is located by the Ambracian Gulf. Its economy is based on tourism and agriculture. It was built in the 1950s under an official government plan to house victims of the Greek Civil War and other families who did not own houses. Today is a popular destination for Greek and foreign tourists.

Subdivisions
The municipal unit Menidi is subdivided into the following communities (constituent villages in brackets):
Menidi (Menidi, Elaiochori, Theriakisi, Katsouli, Lagkada, Sykoula)
Floriada (Floriada, Elaiofyto, Katharovouni, Kastriotissa, Palaia Floriada, Palaiokastro, Chrysopigi, Chrysorrachi)

Historical population

References

External links
Menidi (official web site) 
Menidi (municipality) on GTP Travel Pages 
Menidi (community) on GTP Travel Pages

See also
List of settlements in Aetolia-Acarnania

Populated places in Aetolia-Acarnania